Istanbul Beneath My Wings (Original Turkish title: İstanbul Kanatlarımın Altında) is a 1996 Turkish film, written and directed by Mustafa Altıoklar. It is a dramatization of Hezarfen Ahmet Çelebi's reported flight across the Bosphorus from Galata.

Plot
The film takes place in the 17th century. Hezarfen Ahmet Çelebi and Lagari Hasan Çelebi are researching bird flight. The new Sultan Murat IV resists the domination of his mother, the Valide Kösem Sultan and tries to enforce strict law and order in the empire. Meanwhile, a Venetian ship that has been captured by Algerian pirates is brought into Istanbul. One of those on the ship is a girl with a manuscript showing how to fly, the latter of which comes into Hezarfen's possession. However, this manuscript can't be deciphered by anyone.

Hezarfen and Hasan are caught examining a dead body (which is against the law) and sent to be executed. At the intervention of the Sultan, they are sent for a court trial.
Hasan tries to justify the research and experiments by claiming that they could be used as a weapon to defeat the enemies of the Ottomans. Murat forbids experiments on dead human bodies but gives his blessing to the duo's research on flying, hoping for a new army of flying soldiers that could get past ground level barriers like walls and the sea, and drop bombs. To go about their task, Hezarfen and Hasan tell Murat of the undecipherable script and ask him to release the girl from the dungeon.

The script belongs to Leonardo da Vinci and they realise that he too had the same idea of flying with wings, but the text is coded so they are unable to read it. Hezarfan and the girl (whose name turns out to be Franceska) fall in love. After witnessing some fireworks, Hasan tries experimenting with rockets and during a grand launch, manages to reach a reasonable altitude before bailing out and landing in the water below. When some drinks are accidentally spilt on the manuscript, the coded text becomes visible and Hezarfen uses his own ideas and that of Da Vinci's to build a flying machine consisting of artificial wings. The conservative Şeyh-ül İslam who is against Hezarfen tries to turn the Sultan against him. He succeeds when the Sultan bans Hezarfen from flying and orders his arrest. Hezarfen (with Franceska) manages to escape with the help of Evliya Çelebi to the Maiden's Tower and launches his flying machine across the Bosporus.

Cast
 Ege Aydan as Hezarfen Ahmet Çelebi
 Okan Bayülgen as Lagari Hasan Çelebi
 Beatriz Rico as Franceska
 Burak Sergen as Sultan Murat IV
 Savaş Ay as Bekri Mustafa
 Zuhal Olcay as Kösem Sultan
 Haluk Bilginer as Evliya Çelebi
 Tuncel Kurtiz as Topal Recep Paşa
 Giovanni Scognamillo as Antonio Ağa
 Ayton Sert as Hekimbaşı
 Berke Hürcan as Musa Çelebi
 Nazan Kesal as Fahişe
 Altan Günbay as Meyhaneci Agop
 Akasya Asıltürkmen as Leyla Hazer
 Cüneyt Çalışkur as Şeyh-ül İslam

Awards
Burak Sergen was awarded "Most Promising New Actor" at the 8th Ankara Film Festival. The film also won awards for "Best Music" (Tuluyhan Uğurlu) and "Best Cinematography" (Uğur İçbak) at the 18th SİYAD awards.

Bibliography
 Türker İnanoğlu, 5555 Afişle Türk Sineması. İstanbul: Kabalcı, 2004.
 Agâh Özgüç, Ansiklopedik Türk Filmleri Sözlüğü. İstanbul: Horizon International Yayınları, 2012.
 Agâh Özgüç, Türk Filmleri Sözlüğü 1917-2009. İstanbul: T. C. Kültür ve Turizm Bakanlığı ve SESAM, 2009.
 Deniz Yavuz, Türkiye Sinemasının 22 Yılı (1990-2011). İstanbul: Antrakt Sinema Kitaplığı, 2013.

References

External links

1990s fantasy drama films
1996 LGBT-related films
1996 films
Turkish aviation films
Films set in Istanbul
Films set in Turkey
Turkish fantasy drama films
1990s Turkish-language films
Turkish LGBT-related films
1996 drama films